William J. Quinn (April 23, 1883 – October 10, 1963) native of San Francisco, California. He attended Lincoln Grammar School, Sacred Heart College and studied law at Saint Ignatius College (now the University of San Francisco), graduating in 1925. He walked his first police beat in 1906.

Served as Chief of Police in San Francisco, California from January 1, 1929 until February 15, 1940.  Chief Quinn presided over the modernization of the SFPD and is credited with establishing the first juvenile bureau and putting radios in police cars. He was Chief during the Jessie Scott Hughes murder trial of Frank Egan and the 1934 San Francisco General Strike on the waterfront where he took a rock to the head, and during the period of the investigations by Edwin Atherton who published the Atherton Report on police graft and corruption.

Quinn died on October 10, 1963 at the Livermore Sanitorium. He was interred at Holy Cross Cemetery in Colma, California.

External links
Information about the 1934 general strike

History of San Francisco
University of San Francisco alumni
1883 births
1963 deaths
San Francisco Police Department chiefs